Enyocera is a genus of moths of the family Crambidae. It contains only one species, Enyocera latilimbalis, which is found on Sumatra.

References

Pyraustinae
Crambidae genera